Livadia can refer to:

Places

Crimea
 Livadiya, Crimea (Лівадія or Ливадия), a suburb of Yalta, Crimea

Cyprus
Livadia, Famagusta, a village in Cyprus
Livadia, Larnaca, a village in Cyprus
Livadia, Nicosia, a village in Cyprus

Greece
 Livadeia (Λιβαδειά), a city in Boeotia, Greece
 Livadia, Andros, a village on the island of Andros
 Livadia, Astypalaia, a settlement on the island of Astypalaia
 Livadia, Kilkis (Λιβάδια), a community in Kilkis regional unit, Greece
 Livadia, Paros, a settlement on the island of Paros
 Livadia, Rethymno (Λιβάδια), a community in Rethymno regional unit, Greece
 Livadia, Tilos, a settlement on the island of Tilos

Romania
 Livadia, a village in Baru Commune, Hunedoara County, Romania
 Livadia, a village in the town of Băile Olănești, Vâlcea County, Romania

Russia
 Livadiya, Primorsky Krai, a suburb of Nakhodka, Russia, near Mount Livadiyskaya
 Livadia Range in the Sikhote-Alin mountains in the Russian Far East
 Mount Livadiyskaya in the Sikhote-Alin mountains in the Russian Far East

Buildings
 Livadia Palace, Livadia, Crimea

Ships
 , a Russian yacht completed in 1873 and wrecked in 1878
 , a Russian yacht completed in 1880 and written off in 1926

See also
 Livadica, Podujevo, a village in Kosovo